Penny Anderson (born 14 January 1977) is a former Australian rugby union player. She competed for Australia at the 2002 Rugby World Cup in Spain.

Anderson played six test matches for the Wallaroos between 2001 and 2002. She made her international debut for Australia against England in 2001. Her final appearance for the Wallaroos was against Scotland at the 2002 World Cup.

References 

1977 births
Living people
Australian female rugby union players
Australia women's international rugby union players